Bob Peterson (born March 15, 1962) is an American politician who served as a Republican member of the Ohio Senate from the 17th District, where served as President Pro Tempore. From 2011 to 2012, he served as a member of the Ohio House of Representatives, representing the 85th district. Before being elected to the Ohio House of Representatives, he was Fayette County Commissioner for 14 years. He was first elected as a state representative in November 2010.

Peterson was elected to a full-term to the Ohio Senate on November 6, 2012 and was sworn-in January, 2013.

Education and early career 
Peterson graduated from The Ohio State University, receiving his bachelor's degree in Agriculture, with a focus in Animal Science and Agriculture Economics. He served as a Fayette County Farm Bureau President from 1990-1992 and was elected to the Ohio Farm Bureau in 1995. Peterson served as a Fayette County Commissioner for fourteen years before being elected to the Ohio House of Representatives in 2011.

Political career 
After being elected to the Ohio House, Peterson applied to fill the vacant seat for the Ohio Senate seat representing the 17th district in 2012.

While a member of the Ohio Senate, Peterson has served as the Chairman of many Committees including: the General Government Subcommittee of Finance, Ways and Means Committee, Capitol Square Review and Advisory Board, the Joint Commission on Agency Rule Review and has served as a member of the Ohio Controlling Board.

As of 2018, Peterson served as Vice Chair of the Senate Rules and Reference Committee and as a member of the Ways and Means Committee, Agriculture Committee, Government Oversight and Reform Committee, Local Government, Public Safety and Veterans Affairs Committee, and Finance General Government Subcommittee.

Senator Peterson has been awarded for his efforts in the Ohio Statehouse, including the Watchdog of the Treasury Award from the United Conservatives, the Council of Smaller Enterprises’ Small Business Advocate Award, the Ohio Farm Bureau Friend of Agriculture, the NFIB’s Guardian of Small Business Award, Legislator of the Year from the County Engineers Association of Ohio, and the Nature Conservancy’s commitment to improving Ohio's water quality award.

References

External links
 The Ohio Senate: Senator Bob Peterson (R) - District 17
 Peterson for Ohio, official campaign website

1962 births
21st-century American politicians
Candidates in the 2021 United States elections
Living people
Republican Party members of the Ohio House of Representatives
Republican Party Ohio state senators
Ohio State University College of Food, Agricultural, and Environmental Sciences alumni
People from Washington Court House, Ohio